was a Japanese actress who performed in movies such as Gamera vs. Zigra and Female Convict Scorpion: Jailhouse 41.

References

External links 
 
 八並 映子 at eiga.com

1948 births
2017 deaths
Japanese actresses